Konstantinos Nikolopoulos (born 13 July 2002) is a Greek professional footballer who plays as a forward for Asteras Stavrou.

Club career

Lamia
Nikolopoulos joined Lamia youth team in 2019 and was transferred to Lamia current squad in 2020.

References

External links
Lamia Official website
League Greece Player Profile - Konstantinos Nikolopoulos

2002 births
Living people
Football League (Greece) players
Association football central defenders
Super League Greece players
PAS Lamia 1964 players
Footballers from Athens
Greek footballers